The Monk, the Moor and Moses Ben Jalloun is a 2012 novel by Saeed Akhtar Mirza. The book was published by HarperCollins, and follows four students as they discover themselves by learning about the past.

Plot
The novel centers on four students attending an American university and studying history. The book particularly focuses on the tale of the eleventh century Iranian Rehana, a woman with a zest for learning. As the students study the past, they begin to learn more about themselves and how actions in the past can affect them in the present and future.

Reception
Critical reception for the book was positive, with the Deccan Chronicle calling it a "lovely work". The Hindu mostly praised the novel, but stated that an index or a bibliography would have been useful. IBN Live also gave a positive review, calling it "a great addition to any bookcase".

References

Indian English-language novels
Fourth Estate books
2012 Indian novels